Lubrza  is a village in Prudnik County, Opole Voivodeship, in south-western Poland, close to the Czech border. It is the seat of the gmina (administrative district) called Gmina Lubrza. It had a population of 965 in December 2013.

Name 
The village has had numerous names in its history. It was named Lubra by its founder, and over the next few centuries was known as Lubrac, Lubrzi and Leuber (in that order.) Leuber being the German name for the village, it kept that name until it became part of Poland in 1946, Switching to its current name of Lubrza.

History 
The village was first mentioned in the will of the founder of the village, dated 1233. For the next few centuries, there were a few scattered references to the village, often under different names. Over all this time, Lubrza had been ruled by the Piast dynasty, first as part of Poland then part of the Duchies of Silesia, but the Duchies were no more than a vassal to the neighbouring Kingdom of Bohemia. It was taken by the Habsburg monarchy in 1526, Only to be taken by Prussia in 1742 in the Silesian Wars. After the Franco-Prussian wars and the creation of a unified Germany, Lubrza became part of the German Empire. The Soviet Red Army occupied the village in 1945, and it became part of Poland when the new German borders were set out the year after (see Territorial changes of Poland after World War II).

References 

Villages in Prudnik County